Taza is a province in the Moroccan region of Fès-Meknès. Its population at the 2004 Census was 743,237. 

The major cities and towns are: 
 Ajdir, Taza
 Aknoul
 Matmata
 Oued Amlil
 Oulad Zbair
 Tahla
 Tainaste
 Taza
 Tizi Ouasli
 Zrarda
 Mezguitem

Subdivisions
The province is divided administratively into the following:

References

 
Taza Province